Ravi Yadav (born 18 December 1991) is an Indian cricketer. He made his first-class debut on 27 January 2020, for Madhya Pradesh in the 2019–20 Ranji Trophy. In the match, he became the first bowler to take a hat-trick in his first over on his debut in a first-class cricket match.

References

External links
 

1991 births
Living people
Indian cricketers
Madhya Pradesh cricketers
Place of birth missing (living people)